= Pedro Ortega =

Colombian footballer (born 1982)

Pedro Manuel Ortega Silvera (born 2 February 1982) is a Colombian former footballer who played as a midfielder for Deportes Quindío.
